Truez Neva Stop is the third and final studio album by American hip hop duo Havoc & Prodeje of South Central Cartel. It was released on September 9, 1997 through G.W.K. Records and Pump Records with distribution by Warlock Records for the Quality Records partnership. Recording sessions took place at Audio X in Burbank, California.

Track listing
"Truez Neva Stop" – 4:53  
"Still Gettin' Clowned" – 4:10  
"If U Down Wit Me" – 4:01  
"Fatality" – 4:13  
"Bump" – 4:01  
"Eastsider" – 5:11  
"Da Clipp" – 4:08  
"After Dark" – 3:57  
"G'z Come Out" – 3:59
"Wake Me Up" – 4:58  
"What Does It Take" – 4:46  
"Get Yo Party On" – 3:57  
"Hataz" – 3:49  
"Now I Lay Me Down" – 4:06  
"Paid n Full" – 4:57
"Capable of Murder" – 4:53

References

External links

1997 albums
Havoc & Prodeje albums
South Central Cartel albums
Albums produced by Prodeje
G-funk albums
Gangsta rap albums by American artists
West Coast hip hop albums